Taungtha is a small village in Chauk Township, Magway Division, north-central Myanmar, next to the village of Kyatkan.

Notes

External links
"Taungtha Map — Satellite Images of Taungtha" Maplandia World Gazetteer

Populated places in Magway Region